Verreauxia is a genus of plants of the family Goodeniaceae. It includes species native to Australia and surrounding islands. The genus is named after Jules P. Verreaux (1807–73), a French ornithologist and naturalist. Plants are insect-pollinated and hermaphroditic. Species include Verreauxia dyeri, Verreauxia paniculata, Verreauxia reinwardtii, Verreauxia verreauxii and Verreauxia villosa.

References

Goodeniaceae
Asterales genera
Taxa named by George Bentham